John Bromwich and Louise Brough successfully defended their title, defeating Frank Sedgman and Doris Hart in the final, 6–2, 3–6, 6–3 to win the mixed doubles tennis title at the 1948 Wimbledon Championships.

Seeds

  John Bromwich /  Louise Brough (champions)
  Tom Brown /  Margaret Osborne (semifinals)
  Jaroslav Drobný /  Pat Todd (semifinals)
  Frank Sedgman /  Doris Hart (final)

Draw

Finals

Top half

Section 1

Section 2

Section 3

Section 4

Bottom half

Section 5

Section 6

Section 7

Section 8

References

External links

X=Mixed Doubles
Wimbledon Championship by year – Mixed doubles